Pacuare may refer to:

 The Pacuare River, in Costa Rica
 MV Pacuare, a refrigerated ship in service with Fyffes Line from 1946-59